Lamplighters Yeshivah was a Jewish Montessori-style school for Jewish children located in Crown Heights, Brooklyn that was founded in 2009. In 2020, the school was closed due to financial difficulties.

Background 
Lamplighters Yeshivah was one of the 47 plus Jewish Montessori-style Hebrew day schools or yeshivas in the United States. Lamplighters is located in Crown Heights, Brooklyn and is catered to parents from the local Chabad Hasidic community.

The school was founded in November 2009, with just four families. As of now, the school has shut down as mentioned above.

The name "Lamplighters" was chosen for the school based on the Hasidic teaching that each person can better the world and "transform darkness into light".

Educational style 
Lamplighters incorporates both Jewish and general topics in their curriculum. Teaching methods are heavily influenced by Montessori educational methods. Lessons often blend traditional Jewish topics with general Montessori activities.

References

External links 
 

Montessori schools in the United States
Orthodox yeshivas in Brooklyn
Private elementary schools in Brooklyn
Private middle schools in Brooklyn
Crown Heights, Brooklyn